Aleksei Alekseyevich Yeskov (23 June 194620 March 2002) was a Soviet football player and coach.

International career
Yeskov made his debut for USSR on 1 October 1967, in a friendly against Switzerland.

External links
  Profile 

1946 births
2002 deaths
Russian footballers
Soviet footballers
Soviet Union international footballers
Soviet football managers
Soviet Top League players
FC SKA Rostov-on-Don players
FC Torpedo Moscow players
FC Akhmat Grozny players
FC Akhmat Grozny managers
Sportspeople from Grozny
FC SKA Rostov-on-Don managers
Association football forwards